Hans-Joachim Puls is a German rower, who competed for the SG Dynamo Potsdam / Sportvereinigung (SV) Dynamo. He won medals at international rowing competitions.

References 

Year of birth missing (living people)
German male rowers
Living people
World Rowing Championships medalists for East Germany
European Rowing Championships medalists